Calzedonia Ocean Girls was an Italian reality television series. The show, presented by Simone Annicchiarico, was broadcast on Sky Uno/Cielo in 2014.

Contestants
Selected from over 2,000 girls. They are:
 Rachele Fogar (22 years, Milan)
 Eva Roqueta Vita (30 years, Spagna)
 Giorgia Arosio (21 years, Milan)
 Sara Cardillo (31 years, Benevento)
 Simona Sassone (39 years, Melfi)
 Barbora Vesela (28 years, Praga)
 Jessica De Vincenzi (27 years, Sant'Angelo Romano)
 Simona Pastore (29 years, Catania)
 Ludovica Loda (20 years, Gardone Val Trompia)
 Elisaveta "Lisa" Migatcheva (24 years, Kazan - Russia)

Coaches
 Tanya Streeter (freediving)
 Anna Bader (diving)
 Gisela Pulido (Kiteboarding)
 Lea Peterson (motorcycle stunt-woman) 
 Andrew Cotton (surfing) 
 Roberta Mancino (skydiving)

References

External links 

Italian reality television series
Sky Uno original programming
Cielo (TV channel) original programming